Taklung Monastery, Taklung stag-lung, Taklung Yarthang Monastery, Pel Taklug Tang (dPal sTag lung thang) or Taklung or Taglung Gompa is a Kagyu Buddhist monastery about 120 km north of Lhasa.

History

The monastery was founded in 1180 (or 1178) CE by Taklung Thangpa Tashi Pal (1142–1210), on a site previously inhabited by a famous Kadampa lama, Potowa Rinchen Sel, who was a disciple of Dromton (1005–1064), Atisha's chief disciple. It is the main seat of the Taklung Kagyu, one of the four chief schools of the Kagyu sect.

Through the efforts of Taklung Thangpa Tashi Pal, and his immediate successors, the number of monks eventually increased to 7,000. The main temple known as the Tsuklakhang (the Jokhang of Taklung) was completed in 1228. 
"The sTag-lung-pa Lama [about the end of the 12th century] exemplifies the disciplined and pious existence of the founder of a great monastery. The Blue Annals (pp. 610-20) describes the simple austerity of his life, which was a continual process of silent meditation, preaching, ceremonies and rites. No wine or meat was allowed in his monastery, and no woman might enter his house. He never went for a walk beyond the limits of his monastery, and he never failed to attend to the rites and teachings given by his own Lama Phag-mo-gru (1110-1170 CE). His advice was constantly sought, and he was frequently called upon to mediate in the disputes of his contemporaries."
An eastern branch, Riwoche Monastery in Kham, which was founded by the fourth preceptor, Sangye On, and it gradually gained in importance as the Gelugpa monasteries of Sera and Drepung extended their influence at Taklung. Eventually its power diminished in favour of Riwoche. From the time of the founding of Riwoche Monastery (1276 CE) the Taklung lineage was divided into "upper" and "lower" branches, Taklung forming the "upper" branch.

Taklung was badly damaged during the Cultural Revolution but has since been partially restored.

Description
The massive 13th-century Tsuklakang and the Markang or Red Temple now just form extensive ruins. However, the Jampa Lhakhang dedicated to Maitreya, the Reliquary Lhakhang which contains the remains of the now-looted enormous stupas which once contained the remains of Lhakhang's three founders, the Dargyeling Temple with its statue of Aksobhya Buddha, and the Assembly Hall or Zhelrekhang, and some smaller buildings have been reconstructed.

Gallery

Footnotes

References
Dorje, Gyurme and Matthew Kapstein (1991). The Nyingma School of Tibetan Buddhism: Its Fundamentals and History. Volume Two: Reference Material. Wisdom Publications. Boston. .
Dorje, Gyurme. (2009) Tibet Handbook. Footprint Handbooks, Bath, England. .
Dowman, Keith. (1988). The Power-Places of Central Tibet: The Pilgrim's Guide. Routledge & Kegan Paul, London. .
Snellgrove, David & Hugh Richardson (1968). A Cultural History of Tibet. Shambhala Publications, Boston.  (pbk).

Buddhist monasteries in Lhasa (prefecture-level city)
1180 establishments in Asia
Taklung Kagyu monasteries and temples
Lhünzhub County